Coconut Island, or Moku Ola is a small island in Hilo Bay, just offshore from Lili'uokalani Park and Gardens, in Hilo, off the island of Hawaii. It is a small park, and is connected to the main island via a footbridge. The island includes a large grassy field, picnic areas, restroom facilities, and a few tiny sandy beaches.

A popular recreational activity is to jump off the tower into the waters of Hilo Bay.

The name Mokuola translates as "healing island" or "island of life" from the Hawaiian language. Moku meaning "island" and ola meaning "life." It was the site of an ancient temple dedicated to healing.
It is located off Banyan Drive.

Legend tells that anyone who was sick or feeling ill would be healed by swimming around Mokuola three times. In ancient times, Mokuola was a pu'uhonua (place of refuge), where natives or warriors could "redeem" themselves. Many native Hawaiians would also bury their children's piko (umbilical cords) under the flat rocks here, so the rats would not find them (piko are often considered sacred to Hawaiians, as they are the connection to their mothers and to their blood lines).

References

External links

Islands of Hawaii
Landforms of Hawaii (island)
Hilo, Hawaii
Beaches of Hawaii (island)